Where Trails End is a 1942 American Western film directed by Robert Emmett Tansey and written by Robert Emmett Tansey and Frances Kavanaugh. The film stars Tom Keene, Frank Yaconelli, Joan Curtis, Don Stewart, Charles King and Wilhelm von Brincken. The film was released on May 1, 1942, by Monogram Pictures.

Plot

Cast              
Tom Keene as Tom Kenyon
Frank Yaconelli as Pierre La Fair
Joan Curtis as Joan Allen
Don Stewart as Donny Bedford 
Charles King as Jim Regan
Wilhelm von Brincken as Tip Wallace 
Steve Clark as Steve Allen
Horace B. Carpenter as George Kent 
Nick Moro as Pancake
James Sheridan as Buck
Steven Clensos as Red 
Fred Hoose as Mr. Wade

References

External links
 

1942 films
1940s English-language films
American Western (genre) films
1942 Western (genre) films
Monogram Pictures films
Films directed by Robert Emmett Tansey
American black-and-white films
1940s American films